is a Japanese former tennis player.
She turned professional in 1998. On 15 August 2005, she reached her career-high singles ranking of world No. 41.

Morigami won one singles title in her career, defeating top-seeded Marion Bartoli in 2007 in the final of the Prague Open. She reached two other singles finals, both in Cincinnati (falling to Patty Schnyder in 2005, and losing to Anna Chakvetadze in 2007). At the 2006 French Open, she upset then-world No. 3, Nadia Petrova, in the first round.

Morigami retired after the 2009 Japan Open. In the first round, she defeated qualifier Anastasia Rodionova in three sets, and in the second round, she lost to the eventual champion Samantha Stosur, 1–6, 2–6. This was her last match on the professional tour.

WTA career finals

Singles: 3 (1 title, 2 runner-ups)

Doubles: 2 (1 title, 1 runner-up)

ITF Circuit finals

Singles: 11 (7–4)

Doubles: 3 (3–0)

External links
 
 
 
 
 
 

1980 births
Living people
Japanese female tennis players
Olympic tennis players of Japan
Sportspeople from Osaka
Tennis players at the 2004 Summer Olympics
Asian Games medalists in tennis
Tennis players at the 2002 Asian Games
Tennis players at the 2006 Asian Games
Medalists at the 2002 Asian Games
Medalists at the 2006 Asian Games
Asian Games silver medalists for Japan
Asian Games bronze medalists for Japan
20th-century Japanese women
21st-century Japanese women